A Night Without Armor is a 2017 American film directed and executive produced by Steven Alexander, written and produced by Chaun Domingue.

The film tells the story of a police captain who meets a nurse at an American Civil War era fort during a meteor shower.

Plot

Police Captain Adam Foret (Jacob Fishel) arrives at Fort Jackson, a civil war era fort to watch a meteor shower. He is soon joined by Nicole Hughes (Pepper Binkley), a free-spirited pediatric nurse. As the night progress, Adam and Nicole engage in a rhythmic dialogue ballet,  revealing intimate personal information about themselves; their passion, marriage, worldview, love and pain.

Cast
Jacob Fishel - Adam Foret
Pepper Binkley - Nicole Hughes
Riley Domingue - Cody Foret

References

External links

2017 films
American romantic drama films
2017 romantic drama films
2010s American films